Charles Underwood (1791 – 5 March 1883, Clifton, Bristol) was a builder in Cheltenham who moved to Bristol, where he became a neo-classical architect.

He designed the Greek revival buildings of Arnos Vale Cemetery (1836) and the Royal West of England Academy (1857), as well as the impressive Worcester Terrace in central Clifton.

His brothers George Allen Underwood and Henry Underwood were also architects.

References

 H.M. Colvin, A Biographical Dictionary of British Architects, 1600-1840 (1997) 

1791 births
1883 deaths
19th-century English architects
Architects from Bristol